Stadio Polisportivo Provinciale is a multi-use stadium in Erice, Italy. It is being used by the football team Trapani Calcio and was built by the Province of Trapani in the 1960. The grass covers 105x65 metres.

External links

 Stadium pictures

References

Polisportivo Provinciale
Erice